Gaikundi (lit. "village language") is one of the Ndu languages of Sepik River region of northern Papua New Guinea.

References

Languages of East Sepik Province
Ndu languages